Desmond Lacey (3 August 1925 – 1974) was an Irish footballer.

Lacey made one appearance for Chester in the Football League, when he wore the number seven shirt during a 3–0 victory at home to Lincoln City in April 1947. Despite this success, he was not selected again and he moved to Witton Albion.

Bibliography

References

1925 births
1974 deaths
Association footballers from County Dublin
Republic of Ireland association footballers
English Football League players
Association football wingers
Chester City F.C. players
Witton Albion F.C. players